Steele Township is one of ten townships in Daviess County, Indiana. As of the 2010 census, its population was 903 and it contained 399 housing units.

History
Steele Township was organized in 1835 out of what had been northern Washington Township.  It was settled later than most other Daviess County townships—the earliest settlers in the county were primarily hillfolk from Tennessee, Kentucky, and the Carolinas; they were unfamiliar with the bottomland prevalent in the township, and folklore of the day held that malaria was far more prevalent in lowlands.  The first settlement was made around 1820; in the township's earliest years, it was isolated by poor transportation, but the construction of the Wabash and Erie Canal led to an economic boom for a short time, before the canal was abandoned.

Geography
Melton Pond is in this township.

Cities and towns
 Plainville

Unincorporated towns
 Capehart

Adjacent townships
 Elmore Township (northeast)
 Bogard Township (east)
 Washington Township (south)
 Vigo Township, Knox County (northwest)

Major highways

Cemeteries
The township contains one cemetery, Plainville.

References
 United States Census Bureau cartographic boundary files
 U.S. Board on Geographic Names

External links

 Indiana Township Association
 United Township Association of Indiana

Townships in Daviess County, Indiana
Townships in Indiana
Populated places established in 1835
1835 establishments in Indiana